Augustus Prew (born 17 September 1987) is an English film and television actor. He is known for his roles in About a Boy (2002), The Secret of Moonacre (2008), Charlie St. Cloud (2010), The Borgias (2011), Kick-Ass 2 (2013), and Klondike (2014). He played Drew Jessup on the TV series 24Seven (2001–2002), James Bell on the CBS medical drama Pure Genius (2016–2017), and David "Whip" Martin on the Fox crime drama Prison Break (2017).

Early life
Prew was born in Westminster, London, England and is the son of Wendy Dagworthy, a fashion designer, and Jonathan W. Prew, a photographer.

Personal life 
Prew married fellow actor Jeffery Self on 13 January 2018 in Culver City, California.

Filmography

References

External links
 

1987 births
20th-century English male actors
21st-century English male actors
Male actors from London
English male child actors
English male film actors
English male television actors
Living people
English gay actors
21st-century LGBT people